Ndiss Kaba Badji (born 21 September 1983) is a Senegalese athlete who competes in the long jump and triple jump. He is the Senegalese record holder for triple jump, with 17.07 metres achieved when he won the 2008 African Championships. He has a personal best long jump of 8.32 metres, achieved in October 2009 in Beirut, helping him to win the silver medal at the 2009 Jeux de la Francophonie.

Early career
Badji won a silver medal at the African Junior Championships in 2001. He then competed at the 2002 World Junior Championships in Kingston, Jamaica. Here, he finished ninth in the triple jump. In the long jump competition he exited in the qualification round with a result of 7.37 metres. He missed the final round by only one centimetre. His personal bests at that time were 7.83 metres in the long jump and 16.30 metres in the triple jump, both achieved in Dakar. Later that season he finished fifth at the African Championships in Athletics. He jumped 7.90, albeit with a wind assistance of 3.6 m/s.

In 2003 he finished fifth at the Universiade and won the silver medal at the All-Africa Games in Abuja. His distance achieved there—7.92 metres—was a new personal best.

International career

Breakthrough and fall
In 2004 Badji broke the 8-metre barrier for the first time, jumping 8.00 metres at an indoor meet in February in Moscow. In March he competed at the World Indoor Championships, albeit without reaching the final. However, he capitalized on his 8.00 m result during the outdoor season. He won a silver medal at the African Championships in July, and on 1 August he jumped 8.20 metres at a high altitude in Sestriere. At the Olympic Games three weeks later, however, he failed to reach the final round.

Then, in an IAAF out-of-competition test conducted in March 2005, Badji tested positive for the illegal substance androstenedione. As a result, he was barred from competing in the sport between June 2005 and May 2007.

Return
Badji returned from his suspension in time for the 2007 season. In June in Algiers he achieved a long jump of 8.11 m. At the All-Africa Games held in the same city one month later he won the triple jump competition, with a new personal best of 16.80 metres. He entered the 2007 World Championships in Osaka, where he finished seventh in the long jump competition. He was the only Senegalese person to reach a final at the 2008 Olympic Games. He was also scheduled to enter in triple jump, but did not actually compete.

In 2008 he improved further. At the African Championships only competed in triple jump, but won the gold medal with a new national record of 17.07 metres. At the Olympic Games in August he finished sixth in the long jump competition with a season's best of 8.16 metres. Again he also entered in triple jump, but fouled all his jumps. At the 2008 World Athletics Final he finished seventh in the long jump and eighth in the triple jump.

In early 2009 it was announced that Badji had been awarded the Lion d’Or by the newspaper Le Soleil. He was also elected Sportsman of the Year by the Senegalese sports press.

Competition record

References

1983 births
Living people
Senegalese male long jumpers
Senegalese male triple jumpers
Olympic athletes of Senegal
Athletes (track and field) at the 2004 Summer Olympics
Athletes (track and field) at the 2008 Summer Olympics
Athletes (track and field) at the 2012 Summer Olympics
World Athletics Championships athletes for Senegal
Doping cases in athletics
Senegalese sportspeople in doping cases
African Games gold medalists for Senegal
African Games medalists in athletics (track and field)
Universiade medalists in athletics (track and field)
African Games silver medalists for Senegal
African Games bronze medalists for Senegal
Athletes (track and field) at the 2003 All-Africa Games
Athletes (track and field) at the 2007 All-Africa Games
Athletes (track and field) at the 2011 All-Africa Games
Athletes (track and field) at the 2015 African Games
Universiade medalists for Senegal
Medalists at the 2009 Summer Universiade
Islamic Solidarity Games medalists in athletics
Islamic Solidarity Games competitors for Senegal
20th-century Senegalese people
21st-century Senegalese people